John Phillip "Sean" Wight (15 March 1964 – 30 June 2011) was an Irish-Australian Australian rules footballer in the VFL/AFL.

He is a member of the Melbourne Football Club Hall of Fame and was named as one of the 150 Heroes of the club during the club's 150th celebrations.

The 185 cm tall, 85 kg Wight played for the Melbourne Football Club between 1985 and 1995, playing 150 games and scoring 63 goals.  He is not only the first player to be associated with the Irish experiment, but also considered to be one of its most successful products.

Early life
Wight was scouted by the Melbourne Football Club's Ron Barassi and Barry Richardson on a visit to Ireland in 1982 as having the potential to play Australian rules football.

Before playing Australian rules, he played Gaelic football with the Kerry minor (Under-18) team which reached the final of the 1982 All-Ireland Minor Football Championship and with the Listowel Emmets club – the same club as Tadhg Kennelly.

Wight was brought to Australia in 1983. He was part of an Under 19 VFL premiership side just weeks after his arrival from Ireland in 1983 and was widely hailed for his rapid conversion, though others who joined him from Ireland had much less success.

VFL/AFL career
Wight made his VFL debut in 1985 and became a regular backline player, recognisable with his trademark moustache.

Wight played in two Demons night premiership winning sides, in 1987 and 1989.

He began to develop a reputation as a dour defender, with an exceptional ability to not only spoil opponents marking attempts, but take high marks himself.

Wight, along with fellow recruit Jim Stynes was a member of Melbourne's 1988 VFL Grand Final team which lost to Hawthorn.

Retiring in 1995, Wight's career was somewhat overshadowed by Stynes, whose career in the midfield earned more accolades and media attention.

Wight died on 30 June 2011 after a short battle with lung cancer.

See also
 List of overseas-born AFL players
 Irish Experiment

References

1964 births
2011 deaths
Australian Gaelic footballers
Deaths from cancer in Victoria (Australia)
Deaths from lung cancer
Gaelic footballers who switched code
Irish players of Australian rules football
Kerry inter-county Gaelic footballers
Listowel Emmets Gaelic footballers
Melbourne Football Club players
Scottish emigrants to Australia
Scottish Gaelic footballers
VFL/AFL players born outside Australia
Scottish players of Australian rules football
Sportspeople from Glasgow